Michael C. Gwynne (born October 1, 1942) is an American film, television and radio actor. His film roles include Payday (1973), A Cold Night's Death (1973), Harry in Your Pocket (1973), The Terminal Man (1974), Special Delivery (1976), Butch and Sundance: The Early Days (1979), Raise the Titanic (1980), Threshold (1981), Cherry 2000 (1987), Sunset (1988), Blue Heat (1990), The Last of the Finest (1990) and Private Parts (1997).

Gwynne's distinctive voice is familiar through recordings and radio. He is one of the prime narrators on the 1971 Elektra Records album, "A Child's Garden Of Grass (A Pre-Legalization Comedy)." He has narrated numerous audiobooks autobiographies on Elie Wiesel, Prince and other celebrities.

In the late 1970s and into the 80s, Gwynne joined Phil Austin of the Firesign Theatre and comic Frazer Smith as the multi-voiced three-man cast of an improvisational surrealist comedy radio show, "Hollywood Niteshift," first on KROQ and later on KLOS, both in Los Angeles.

Gwynne is the son of band leader Frankie Kaye.

Filmography

Film

Television

References

External links

1942 births
American male film actors
American male radio actors
American male television actors
Living people
Male actors from Detroit